State Route 156 (SR 156) is a  state highway that serves as a connection between Jachin and Pennington in northeastern Choctaw County. SR 156 intersects SR 17 at its western terminus and SR 114 at its eastern terminus.

Route description
SR 156 begins at an intersection with SR 17 in Jachin. Here, the roadway continues as Choctaw County Route 32 (CR 32). The highway travels to the southeast and curves to the east. In Robjohn, it intersects the southern terminus of Choctaw CR 35 (Riverview Circle). SR 156 crosses over Mill Creek and Deas Branch. It travels through Choctaw City and then intersects Choctaw CR 37 (Cove Road). The highway curves to the east-northeast and crosses over Campbell Branch. After a crossing of Threemile Branch, it curves to the east-southeast and enters Pennington. At the southern terminus of Choctaw CR 33, SR 156 turns right and travels due south. It crosses over some railroad tracks of M&B Railroad just before it reaches its eastern terminus, an intersection with SR 114 (Main Street).

Major intersections

See also

References

156
Transportation in Choctaw County, Alabama